Charah may refer to:

 Charah, Islamabad, a neighbourhood of Islamabad, Pakistan
 Cheraw, also known as Charáh, a historic Native American group

See also 
 Çarah, a village in Azerbaijan
 Chahar (disambiguation)